Pindar (Pindaros,  c. 518 – 438 BC) was an ancient Greek poet.

Pindar may refer to:
 Pindar, one of the Military citadels under London, named after the poet
 Pindar as another name for peanut 
 Pindar Group, former large printing company, based in Eastfield, North Yorkshire
 Pindar River, in India, which emerges from Pindari Glacier
 Pindar, Western Australia

See also
 Pinda (disambiguation)